Hans-Friedrich Böse (born 30 March 1950) is a German sailor. He competed in the Tornado event at the 1984 Summer Olympics.

References

External links
 

1950 births
Living people
German male sailors (sport)
Olympic sailors of West Germany
Sailors at the 1984 Summer Olympics – Tornado
Sportspeople from Bremen